Sittingbourne Football Club are an English football club based in Sittingbourne in Kent. Established in 1886, they were founder members of the Kent League. They have reached the 2nd round of the FA Cup twice in their history.

History

Although an earlier Sittingbourne United club had been playing since as early as 1881, Sittingbourne F.C. traces its lineage to 1886 when the club was reorganised under the new name.  The club moved to a field behind the Bull pub in 1892, where they were to remain for nearly 100 years. Senior status was acquired in 1893, and the following year the club joined the first incarnation of the Kent League, before withdrawing to enter the South Eastern League in 1905.

After World War I the club rejoined the Kent League, where they played until 1927 when they joined the Southern League. In 1930 they left this league and it is unclear where they played next. After World War II the Brickies rejoined the Kent League once again, where they were champions in 1957–58 and 1958–59. After the second title win they rejoined the Southern League, but after a promising start their performances declined and in 1966–67, after finishing bottom, they dropped out to join the Kent Premier League which had changed its name from the Thames & Medway Combination.  This lasted for one season and the league folded.  In 1968 a new Kent league was formed which the club joined.

During season 1961–62 Accrington Stanley left the football league.  This created a vacancy and 25 clubs applied to join, of which Sittingbourne were one.  They did not obtain any votes and Oxford United were elected with 39 votes.

Sittingbourne were Kent League champions in 1975–76, 1983–84 and 1990–91, the third title win earning them a place back in the Southern League. In 1992–93, by now playing at the new Central Park ground, they won promotion to the Southern League Premier Division, however a financial crisis led to relegation two years later.  Although the team bounced back, winning the Southern Division title at the first attempt, they were relegated again in 1998 as the club hovered on the brink of being wound up completely. A move out of Central Park and a drastic reduction in the playing budget saw the Brickies through their troubles, but they flirted with relegation back to the Kent League for a number of years, only finishing in the top half of the table on one occasion in the next eight seasons.

In 2006 a re-organisation of the English football league system saw Sittingbourne moved into the Isthmian League, starting in Division One South. The 2009–10 season ended with Sittingbourne winning the Kent Senior Cup for the first time in 52 years.

Gary Abbott left his position as manager in May 2011 and was replaced by his assistant Richard Brady.  He brought in ex-brickie Jamie Coyle as his assistant.  In September 2011 after a brief spell in charge they were offered management positions at Leatherhead and indicated that the positions were too good to turn down.  Long serving player, Joe Dowley took over the caretaker position of manager with the assistance of players Bradley Spice (assistant manager) and Bryan Glover (coach).  In November 2011 the committee were impressed with what had been achieved that they made their positions permanent.

Joe Dowley resigned as manager after the last game of the 2011–12 season stating that he wished to return to his playing career.  in May 2012 the club employed the Scottish brothers Jim & Danny Ward as joint managers.  They were previously with Ramsgate who they left in April 2012.  The Ward brothers left their position in September 2013 by mutual consent .

In September 2013 after a brief successful spell as caretaker managers, Matt Wyatt and current player and captain Nick Davis were appointed joint managers. In July 2014 Nick Davis resigned as joint manager and Matt Wyatt continued as manager on his own for a short period and then resigned himself in October 2014.  His replacement was his previous joint manager Nick Davis.  Season 2017-18 started with only two players remaining from the previous season. A new squad was recruited and the season started on a positive note and at one point saw them reach the top of the table.  However this did not last and a succession of poor results saw the team drop down the table.

In January 2018 Nick Davis resigned and was replaced by one of the coaches, Aslan Ödev, as an interim manager for the rest of the season. After much success, in April 2018 Aslan Ödev was awarded the role of manager and will continue for the 2018–19 season.  The 2018–19 season started well for the Brickies but then started to go downhill with a string of poor results.  In January 2019 Aslan Odev left his position and was replaced by Chris Lynch the Dover Athletic head of youth development. Results were disappointing after a good start and Chris resigned. Darren Blackburn took over in 2020.

Stadium

Sittingbourne played at the Bull Ground until 1990 when they sold the site for £4.5 million and built a new state of the art stadium on the outskirts of the town named Central Park Stadium. However, overspending on the new ground caused the club financial difficulties and they were forced to sell the ground to the local council and lease it back.  The ground was eventually leased to a company which ran greyhound racing events, who allowed the football club to sign a seven-year lease (a requirement of the Southern League). The club found it hard to guarantee the availability of the stadium due to the racing, however, and agreed to start playing their games on part of the complex where they used to train. This was built in 2002 and named Bourne Park. The ground was shared with Maidstone United between 2002 and 2009, and again for the 2011–12 season, until Maidstone moved into the Gallagher Stadium in July 2012.

In March 2013 it was announced that they would leave Bourne Park at the end of the season for financial reasons and move to the Woodstock Park complex to share with Southern Counties East League side Woodstock Sports who themselves are now defunct.

1881–1890     Sittingbourne Recreation Ground	
1890–1892     Gore Court	
1892–1990     The Bull Ground	
1990–2002     Central Park
2002–2013     Bourne Park
2013–2020  The Martin & Conley Stadium, Woodstock Park
2020-To date The Jarmans Solicitors Stadium, Woodstock park

Coaching and medical staff
Manager: Ryan Maxwell
Assistant Manager: 
Coach: 
Coach: 
First Team Therapist: Harry Chambers

Previous managers

Arthur Banner
John Finch
Walter Rickett
Ray King
Ike Clarke (1957–61)
Charles Rutter
Tony Oakley
1975       to  1977       Gorden Burden
1977       to  1978       Mike Harrington
1978       to  1985       Peter Laraman
1985       to  1987       Arthur Ervine
1987       to  1988       Ray Parker
1988	    to  Jan-92	   Hugh Stinson
Jan-92     to  Mar-92	   Andy Woolford (caretaker)
Mar-92     to  Feb-95	   John Ryan
Feb-95     to  Sep-96	   Steve Lovell
Sep-96     to  Mar-99	   Alan Walker
Mar-99     to  Jan-01	   Hugh Stinson
Jan-01     to  Sep-01	   John Roles
Oct-01     to  Nov-04	   Mark Beeney
Nov-04     to  Mar-05	   Steve Nolan
Mar-05     to  Oct-07	   Steve Lovell
Nov-07     to  Jul-11	   Gary Abbott
Jul-11     to  Sep-11	   Richard Brady
Sep-11     to  Apr-12	   Joe Dowley
May-12     to  Sep-13     Jim & Danny Ward
Sep-13     to  Jul-14     Matt Wyatt & Nick Davis
Jul-14     to  Oct-14     Matt Wyatt
Oct-14     to  Jan-18     Nick Davis
Jan-18     to  Jan-19     Aslan Ödev
Jan-19     to  Feb-20    Chris Lynch
Feb-20.    to  May-22.   Darren Blackburn
May-22.    to. Jan-23.   Nick Davis
Jan-23.    To  present.  Ryan Maxwell

League history

1894–1895: Kent  League
1905–1909: South Eastern League
1909–1927: Kent League
1927–1930: Southern League Eastern Division
1930–1939: Kent League
1946–1959: Kent League
1959–1967: Southern League First Division
1967–1968: Kent Premier League (previously Thames & Medway Combination)
1968–1991: Kent League (reformed league)
1991–1993: Southern League Division One South
1993–1995: Southern League Premier Division
1995–1996: Southern League Division One South
1996–1998: Southern League Premier Division
1998–1999: Southern League Division One South
1999–2006: Southern League Division One East
2006–2018: Isthmian League Division One South
2018–2019: Isthmian League Division One South-East

Club records
Best league performance: Eighth in the Southern League Premier Division, 1993–94 and 1996–97
Best FA Cup performance: Second round, 1925–26 and 1928–29
Best FA Trophy performance: Second round, 1998–99
Best FA Vase performance: Fourth round, 1992–93
Record attendance: 5,951 vs Tottenham Hotspur, friendly, 26 January 1993
Biggest victory: 15–0 vs Orpington, Kent League, 1922–23
Heaviest defeat: 0–10 vs Wimbledon, Southern League Cup, 1965–66

Former players

References

External links
Official website

 
Football clubs in England
Association football clubs established in 1886
Football clubs in Kent
Southern Counties East Football League
Southern Football League clubs
Isthmian League
Sport in Sittingbourne